Jordi Masip López (born 3 January 1989) is a Spanish professional footballer who plays as a goalkeeper for La Liga club Real Valladolid.

He spent the vast majority of his career with Barcelona and Valladolid, being third choice with the first club and starting at the second.

Club career

Barcelona
Born in Sabadell, Barcelona, Catalonia, Masip moved to FC Barcelona's La Masia in 2004, at the age of 15. He made his senior debut in the 2008–09 season, playing with UE Vilajuïga – also in his native region – in the Tercera División, on loan.

Subsequently, Masip returned to FC Barcelona B, serving as backup or third choice during his first years. In the 2014–15 campaign he was promoted to the first team and given the #25 jersey, playing understudy to both Claudio Bravo and Marc-André ter Stegen.

Masip made his competitive debut for the main squad on 16 December 2014, in an 8–1 home win over SD Huesca at the Camp Nou in the round of 32 of the Copa del Rey. On 23 May of the following year, in the last round and as the club had already been crowned champions, he first appeared in La Liga, conceding second-half goals from Lucas Pérez and Diogo Salomão in a 2–2 home draw with Deportivo de La Coruña.

Valladolid

On 17 July 2017, free agent Masip signed a three-year contract with Real Valladolid. He played every minute of his debut campaign apart from the final moments of the victorious play-off final against CD Numancia, when manager Sergio awarded back-up Isaac Becerra some game time with promotion from Segunda División all but assured.

Amidst interest from clubs including Sevilla FC and RC Celta de Vigo, Masip extended his contract in July 2019 to keep him at the Estadio José Zorrilla until 2022. In September 2020, he was sidelined with COVID-19, during which Roberto Jiménez played in the Pucela goal. He played roughly two thirds of league matches as the team were relegated, including when his teammate suffered from the same virus in March; in 2021–22 he was second-choice until December.

Career statistics

Honours
Barcelona
La Liga: 2014–15
Copa del Rey: 2014–15, 2015–16
Supercopa de España: 2016
FIFA Club World Cup: 2015

Valladolid
Segunda División play-offs: 2018

References

External links

FC Barcelona official profile

1989 births
Living people
Sportspeople from Sabadell
Spanish footballers
Footballers from Catalonia
Association football goalkeepers
La Liga players
Segunda División players
Segunda División B players
Tercera División players
FC Barcelona Atlètic players
UE Vilajuïga footballers
FC Barcelona players
Real Valladolid players
Spain youth international footballers
Catalonia international footballers